Jon Crossley is a senior warrant officer in the Royal Air Force. He served as Chief of the Air Staff's Warrant Officer from 2016 to 2019.

Military career
Crossley joined the Royal Air Force (RAF) in November 1985. He trained as a plotter air photographer at RAF Wyton. From June 2014 to October 2016, he served as Station Warrant Officer of Royal Air Force College Cranwell.

References

 

 
 
 

British military personnel of The Troubles (Northern Ireland)
Living people
Military personnel from Lancashire
Royal Air Force airmen
Royal Air Force personnel of the War in Afghanistan (2001–2021)
Year of birth missing (living people)
Warrant Officers of the Royal Air Force